Bronski (also spelled Broński or Bronsky) is a Slavic habitational surname. Notable people with the name include:
 Alina Bronsky (born 1978), Russian-born German writer
 Brick Bronsky (real name Jeffrey Beltzner; 1964-2021), American wrestler and actor
 Michael Bronski (1949), American academic and writer
 Mieczysław Broński (1882–1938), Russian-Polish communist
 Steve Bronski (1960–2021), Scottish singer-songwriter
 Zdzisław Broński (1912–1949), reserve officer of the Polish Army

References 

Polish-language surnames
Polish toponymic surnames